El Sopar is a 1974 documentary film, in Catalan and Spanish, by experimental filmmaker Pere Portabella.  The film takes place on the night of the execution of militant anarchist Salvador Puig Antich by Franco's Spanish State. Using simple cinematic conventions, Portabella's documentary involves five former political prisoners gathered in a farmhouse to prepare dinner and discuss the problems with long prison terms.

To protect the film's subjects from persecution by in Francoist Spain, the film's production was coordinated in secrecy, with notices of the secret shooting location sent to technicians and participants at staggered times.
After Franco’s death, Portabella recut his film and added an interview with Puig Antich’s lawyer. In 2018, he added a new intertitle that refers to the Catalan pro-independence politicians currently in jail.

Specs
Produced by:
Directors: Pere Portabella
Scripts:
Languages: Spanish, Catalan

Sources
Clandesti: Forbidden Catalan Cinema Under Franco at Pragda
Forbidden Catalan Cinema at Film Society of Lincoln Center

References

External links 
 

1974 films
Spanish documentary films
1970s Spanish-language films
Documentary films about anarchism
Barcelona in popular culture
1974 documentary films
Francoist Spain
Films directed by Pere Portabella